Zhang Gui (255–314) was the governor of Liang province and first Duke of Xiping under Western Jin.  He was the seventeenth generation descendant of King of Changshan Zhang Er from the Chu–Han Contention era. In 301, appointed as governor of the Liang province.  In 313, granted the title Duke of Xiping. The following year, Zhang Gui died from an illness and his followers supported his eldest son Zhang Shi to continue the governor position.

References

Monarchs of Former Liang
314 deaths
255 births